The Nassau Light Railway (Nassauische Kleinbahn AG) was a narrow gauge railway in Nassau, Germany, connecting the Lahn, Aar and Rhine areas. It was founded in 1898, and the company existed until 1977, although its services were significantly reduced in the 1950s. Its bus lines are however operated by the Nassau Transport Company (Nassauische Verkehrs-GmbH).

References

External links
 

Railway companies of Germany
Railway companies established in 1898
Railway companies disestablished in 1977
Narrow gauge railways in Germany